Ocyptamus is a large and diverse genus of over 200 species of hoverfly mostly found in the Neotropical region. It is likely that many of these species will be discovered to be synonyms though many others await description.

Classification
There is evidence that the genus is not monophyletic and is paraphyletic with regard to Eosalpingogaster and Toxomerus, and some subgenera have been given full generic status (Hybobathus, Pelecinobaccha, Orphnabaccha, and Pseudoscaeva).

Selected Species

Subgenus: Ocyptamus Macquart, 1834
O. antiphates (Walker, 1849)
O. calla (Curran, 1941)
O. cylindricus (Fabricius, 1781)
O. dimidiatus (Fabricius, 1781)
O. fasciatus Roeder, 1885
O. funebris Macquart, 1834
O. fuscipennis (Say, 1823)
O. gastrostactus (Wiedemann, 1830)
O. icarus Reemer, 2010
O. inca (Curran, 1939)
O. infuscatus Bigot, 1884
O. iris (Austen, 1893)
O. medina (Telford, 1973)
O. papilionarius (Hull, 1943)
O. princeps (Hull, 1944)
O. stolo (Walker, 1852)
O. tarsalis (Walker, 1836)
Subgenus: Hermesomyia Vockeroth, 1969
O. wulpianus (Lynch Arribalzaga, 1891)
Subgenus: Pipunculosyrphus Hull, 1937
O. globiceps (Hull, 1937)
O. scintillans (Hull, 1943)
O. tiarella (Hull, 1944)
Subgenus: Mimocalla Hull, 1943
O. bonariensis (Brethes, 1905)
O. capitatus (Loew, 1863)
O. conjunctus (Wiedemann, 1830)
O. erebus (Hull, 1943)
O. flata (Hull, 11940)
O. giganteus (Schiner, 1868)
O. nymphaea (Hull, 1943)
O. sargoides (Macquart, 1850)
O. tristani Zumbado, 2000
O. willistoni Thompson, 1976
Subgenus: Styxia Hull, 1943
O. ariela (Hull, 1944)
O. eblis (Hull, 1943)
Subgenus: Calostigma Shannon, 1927
O. coreopsis (Hull, 1944)
O. elnora (Shannon, 1927)
O. exiguus (Williston, 1888)
O. ornatipes (Curran, 1927)
O. striatus (Walker, 1852)
Subgenus: Atylobaccha Hull, 1949
O. flukiella (Curran, 1941)

Proposed Genera
In 2020, five new genera were proposed for "orphaned" lineages within Ocyptamus, containing these species. The new genera are sometimes used for these species.

Genus Fragosa
 argentina (Curran, 1939)
 aurora (Hull, 1943)
 deceptor (Curran, 1930)
 filiola (Shannon, 1927)
 filissima (Hull, 1943)
 harlequina (Hull, 1948)
 hyacinthia (Hull, 1947)
 macer (Curran, 1930)
 mara (Curran, 1941)
 oenone (Hull, 1949)
 provocans (Curran, 1939)
 rugosifrons (Schiner, 1868)
 stenogaster (Williston, 1888)
 tenuis (Walker, 1852)
 titania (Hull, 1943)
 virgilio (Hull, 1942)
 zephyrea (Hull, 1947b)

Genus Hypocritanus
 fascipennis (Wiedemann, 1830)
 lemur (Osten Sacken, 1877)

Genus Maiana
 callida (Hine, 1914)
 pumila (Austen, 1893)

Genus Nuntianus
 abata (Curran, 1938)
 aeolus (Hull, 1943)
 anona (Hull, 1943)
 arabella (Hull, 1947)
 banksi (Hull, 1941)
 cecrops (Hull, 1958)
 chapadensis (Curran, 1930)
 confusus (Goot, 1964)
 crocatus (Austen, 1893)
 croceus (Austen, 1893)
 cubanus (Hull, 1943)
 cultratus (Austen, 1893)
 cymbellina (Hull, 1944)
 debasa (Curran, 1941)
 delicatissimus (Hull, 1943)
 dryope (Hull, 1958)
 fervidus (Austen, 1893)
 filii (Doesburg, 1966)
 flavens (Austen, 1893)
 geijskesi (Doesburg, 1966)
 gilvus (Austen, 1893)
 halcyone (Hull, 1949)
 hippolite (Hull, 1957)
 hyalipennis (Curran, 1930)
 inornatus (Walker, 1836)
 io (Hull, 1944)
 iona (Curran, 1941)
 lepidus (Macquart, 1842)
 lucretia (Hull, 1949)
 luctuosus (Bigot, 1884)
 micropyga (Curran, 1941)
 minimus (Hull, 1943)
 murinus (Curran, 1930)
 myiophagus (Thompson, 2018)
 neoparvicornis (Telford, 1973)
 neptunus (Hull, 1943)
 neuralis (Curran, 1934)
 niobe (Hull, 1943)
 nora (Curran, 1941)
 obliquus (Curran, 1941)
 octomaculatus (Thompson, 1976)
 oriel (Hull, 1942)
 panamensis (Curran, 1930)
 peri (Hull, 1943)
 philippianus (Enderlein, 1938)
 prenes (Curran, 1930)
 prudens (Curran, 1934)
 pullus (Sack, 1921)
 punctifrons (Williston, 1891)
 pyxia (Hull, 1943)
 saffrona (Hull, 1943)
 spatulatus (Giglio-Tos, 1892)
 vanessa (Hull, 1949)
 variegatus (Macquart, 1842)
 verona (Curran, 1941)
 victoria (Hull, 1941)
 vierecki (Curran, 1930)
 xanthopterus (Wiedemann, 1830)
 xantippe (Hull, 1949)
 zenillia (Curran, 1941)
 zita (Curran, 1941)
 zobeide (Hull, 1943)
 zoroaster (Hull, 1943)
 
Genus Victoriana
 attenuata (Williston, 1891)
 duida (Hull, 1947)
 ferruginea (Thompson, 1981)
 laudabilis (Williston, 1891)
 lugubris (Philippi, 1865)
 melanorrhina (Philippi, 1865)
 mentor (Curran, 1930)
 oblonga (Walker, 1852)
 parvicornis (Loew, 1861)
 sagittifera (Austen, 1893)
 sativa (Curran, 1941)
 selene (Hull, 1949)
 zilla (Hull, 1943)

See also
 List of Ocyptamus species

References

External links
For many photographic examples: https://www.flickr.com/search/?q=ocyptamus&w=all

Diptera of South America
Diptera of North America
Hoverfly genera
Taxa named by Pierre-Justin-Marie Macquart